This article details the fixtures and results of the Iraq national football team in 2011.

Schedule

Friendlies

2011 Asian Cup

External links
iraq-football.net/ 
iraqfc.webs.com/